Donelson may refer to:
Fort Donelson, near Nashville, Tennessee
Battle of Fort Donelson
Donelson, Tennessee, a suburb of Nashville
Donelson Christian Academy Christian school in Donelson
USS Fort Donelson, a ship in the American Civil War
Donelson (surname)

See also
Danielson (disambiguation)
Danielsson (disambiguation)
Danielsen (disambiguation)
Danielsan (disambiguation)
Denílson (disambiguation)